The Guilt Trip is a 2012 American road comedy film directed by Anne Fletcher from a screenplay written by Dan Fogelman, starring Barbra Streisand and Seth Rogen, who both also served as executive producers on the film. The film was released on December 19, 2012, received mixed reviews from critics, and grossed $41 million on a production budget of $40 million.

Plot

Andy Brewster is a UCLA-graduate organic chemist and inventor. He is attempting to get his environmentally friendly cleaning product, ScieoClean, in a major retail store. However, everywhere he visits dismisses him before he can end his pitch. 

After a disappointing sales pitch to K-Mart, he visits his mother, Joyce Brewster, in New Jersey before leaving on a cross-country trip to Las Vegas, lying that his pitch went well so she won't worry. 

While there she reveals that he was named after Andrew Margolis, a boy she fell in love with in Florida, who she hoped would object to her marriage with Andy's father. However, he didn't and she felt she'd never mattered to him afterwards. After a little research, he finds Andrew Margolis is alive, unmarried and living in San Francisco. He invites his unknowing mother on the trip, saying he wants to spend some time with her.

The road trip quickly becomes hard for Andy as his mother meddles in his life. After their car breaks down in Tennessee, Joyce calls Andy's ex-girlfriend Jessica, whom she insists he should get back together with, to pick them up. At a pregnant and married Jessica's house she reveals that Andy proposed to her before college and she turned him down, shocking an unknowing Joyce. 

Andy is glum afterward and Joyce apologizes for calling Jessica, which he half-heartedly accepts. In Texas, he meets with Costco executive Ryan McFee; however, Joyce stays at the meeting, criticizing the product's labeling and name along with Ryan until Andy snaps at him. At the motel that night, a depressed Andy begins drinking and Joyce attempts to make up with him; however, Andy snaps at her, only to have Joyce snap back and leave for a nearby bar. Later Andy attempts to retrieve his mother but gets in a fight with a bar patron over her, receiving a black eye in the process.

At a steak restaurant the next day, the two exchange apologies and Andy reveals that he is failing at selling ScieoClean. Joyce enters a steak-eating challenge where she is noticed by cowboy-businessman Ben Graw, who gives her tips to help her finish the challenge. Afterwards he reveals he does business in New Jersey and asks her to dinner. Joyce, who has not been in a relationship since Andy's dad died when he was eight, balks at the offer so Ben merely leaves his number and asks her to call if she reconsiders.

Andy and Joyce begin to genuinely enjoy each other's company after, taking time to visit the Grand Canyon (which Joyce has always wanted to see) and having many other adventures.

In Las Vegas, Joyce has such a good time that she suggests Andy leave her while he visits San Francisco, forcing him to reveal that San Francisco is so she can meet Andrew Margolis. Joyce is very distraught as she believed Andy solely invited her to spend time with her. 

Andy makes his pitch at the Home Shopping Network but finds that his science-fact based pitch bores the executives. Seeing Joyce, he takes her advice by appealing to the Network's host family's safety. Andy drinks his product, proving that it is organic and safe for children. Afterwards the Network CEO approaches him and shows genuine interest in selling ScieoClean on the Network. Later, a jubilant Andy and Joyce decide to visit Andrew Margolis's house.

However, when they arrive they see it's Andrew's son, Andrew Margolis Jr. (whom Andy mistakenly found instead of the father), who reveals that his father died five years ago. Seeing Joyce's grief he invites them inside, where he learns that his father and Joyce were close. She asks if Andrew's father ever mentioned her, but he says he never did as he only confided personal information to their mother, who is in Florida. However, he then introduces his sister, who is also named Joyce. Joyce is overjoyed, as she believes that you name your children after someone you cherished and want to remember. This shatters her belief that she didn't matter to Andrew.

Afterwards they part ways at the San Francisco Airport; Andy to make his next sales pitch and Joyce back to New Jersey, where she arranges a date with Ben Graw. The two leave content and much closer than they had been.

Cast

Production

The film is based on a real-life trip by screenwriter Fogelman and his mother from New Jersey to Las Vegas years before. The film completed production in late spring or early summer (May–July) 2011 under the working title My Mother's Curse. In late 2011, the film was renamed The Guilt Trip. It was released December 19, 2012.

This film marks Streisand's first starring role since The Mirror Has Two Faces in 1996. She appeared in supporting roles in Meet the Fockers in 2004 and Little Fockers in 2010, as well as in a number of television series.

Release

Box office
The Guilt Trip grossed $5.3 million in its opening weekend, coming in at No. 6.  It ultimately grossed $37.1 million in the US and $4.7 million elsewhere, for a total of $41.9 million worldwide.

Critical response
On Rotten Tomatoes the film has an approval rating of 37% based on 128 reviews, with an average rating of 5.10/10. The website's critical consensus states: "Seth Rogen and Barbra Streisand have enough chemistry to drive a solidly assembled comedy; unfortunately, The Guilt Trip has a lemon of a script and is perilously low on comedic fuel." On Metacritic, the film has a weighted average score of 50 out of 100, based on 25 critics, indicating "mixed or average reviews". Audiences surveyed by CinemaScore gave the film a grade "B−" on scale of A to F.

Mary Pols of Time stated, "The Guilt Trip works because we all know and like a Joyce Brewster (or dozens of them)". At the 33rd Golden Raspberry Awards, Streisand was nominated for Worst Actress, where she lost to Kristen Stewart for both Snow White and the Huntsman and The Twilight Saga: Breaking Dawn – Part 2.

References

External links
 
 
 
 
 

2012 films
2010s comedy road movies
American comedy road movies
2010s English-language films
Films shot in California
Films shot in Newark, New Jersey
Films shot in the Las Vegas Valley
Paramount Pictures films
Films directed by Anne Fletcher
Films scored by Christophe Beck
Films produced by Seth Rogen
Films produced by Lorne Michaels
Films with screenplays by Dan Fogelman
2012 comedy films
Films produced by Evan Goldberg
Films about mother–son relationships
Skydance Media films
2010s American films